The Dynamic Sport Gravis is a Polish single-place, paraglider that was designed by Wojtek Pierzyński and produced by Dynamic Sport of Kielce. It is now out of production.

Design and development
The Gravis was designed as a beginner glider. The models are each named for their relative size.

Operational history
Reviewer Noel Bertrand described the Gravis in a 2003 review as priced very competitively.

Variants
Gravis M
Medium-sized model for mid-weight pilots.
Gravis L
Large-sized model for heavier pilots.
Gravis XL
Extra large-sized model for much heavier pilots.

Specifications (Gravis L)

References

Gravis
Paragliders